The 13th World Science Fiction Convention (Worldcon), also known as Clevention, was held on 2–5 September 1955 at the Manger Hotel in Cleveland, Ohio, United States.

The chairmen were Nick and Noreen Falasca. The guests of honor were Isaac Asimov (pro) and Sam Moskowitz (mystery GoH).

Participants 

Attendance was approximately 380.

Awards

1955 Hugo Awards 

This convention was the second Worldcon to award the Hugos, and Hugo Awards have been a permanent fixture of the conventions since then. The 11th was the first one, but the 12th did not award any awards.

The winners were:

 Best Novel: They'd Rather Be Right, by Mark Clifton and Frank Riley
 Best Novelette: "The Darfsteller", by Walter M. Miller, Jr.
 Best Short Story: "Allamagoosa", by Eric Frank Russell
 Best Professional Artist: Frank Kelly Freas
 Best Professional Magazine: Astounding, edited by John W. Campbell, Jr.
 Best Fanzine: Fantasy Times, edited by James V. Taurasi, Sr. and Ray Van Houten

See also 

 Hugo Award
 Science fiction
 Speculative fiction
 World Science Fiction Society
 Worldcon

References 

1955 conferences
1955 in Ohio
Culture of Cleveland
Science fiction conventions in the United States
Worldcon